In economics, valuation using multiples, or "relative valuation", is a process that consists of:
 identifying comparable assets (the peer group) and obtaining market values for these assets.
 converting these market values into standardized values relative to a key statistic, since the absolute prices cannot be compared. This process of standardizing creates valuation multiples.
 applying the valuation multiple to the key statistic of the asset being valued, controlling for any differences between asset and the peer group that might affect the multiple.

Multiples analysis is one of the oldest methods of analysis.  It was well understood in the 1800s and widely used by U.S. courts during the 20th century, although it has recently declined as Discounted Cash Flow and more direct market-based methods have become more popular.
"Comparable company analysis",  closely related, was introduced by economists  at Harvard Business School in the 1930s.

Valuation multiples
A valuation multiple is simply an expression of market value of an asset relative to a key statistic that is assumed to relate to that value. To be useful, that statistic – whether earnings, cash flow or some other measure – must bear a logical relationship to the market value observed; to be seen, in fact, as the driver of that market value.

Other commonly used multiples are based on the enterprise value of a company, such as (EV/EBITDA, EV/EBIT, EV/NOPAT). These multiples reveal the rating of a business independently of its capital structure, and are of particular interest in mergers, acquisitions and transactions on private companies.

Not all multiples are based on earnings or cash flow drivers. The price-to-book ratio (P/B) is a commonly used benchmark comparing market value to the accounting book value of the firm's assets. The price/sales ratio and EV/sales ratios measure value relative to sales. These multiples must be used with caution as both sales and book values are less likely to be value drivers than earnings.

Less commonly, valuation multiples may be based on non-financial industry-specific value drivers, such as enterprise value / number of subscribers for cable or telecoms businesses or enterprise value / audience numbers for a broadcasting company. In real estate valuations, the sales comparison approach often makes use of valuation multiples based on the surface areas of the properties being valued.

Peer group
A peer group is a set of companies or assets which are selected as being sufficiently comparable to the company or assets being valued (usually by virtue of being in the same industry or by having similar characteristics in terms of earnings growth and/or return on investment).

In practice, no two businesses are alike, and analysts will often make adjustment to the observed multiples in order to attempt to harmonize the data into a more comparable format. These adjustments may be based on a number of factors, including:
 Industrial / business environment factors: Business model, industry, geography, seasonality, inflation
 Accounting factors: Accounting policies, financial year end
 Financial: Capital structure
 Empirical factors: Size

These adjustments can involve the use of regression analysis against different potential value drivers and are used to test correlations between the different value drivers. Such methods can significantly improve valuation accuracy.

When the peer group consists of public quoted companies, this type of valuation is also often described as comparable company analysis (or "comps", "peer group analysis", "equity comps", " trading comps", or "public market multiples"). When the peer group consists of companies or assets that have been acquired in mergers or acquisitions, this type of valuation is described as precedent transaction analysis (or "transaction comps", "deal comps", or "private market multiples").

Advantages/disadvantages of multiples

Disadvantages
There are a number of criticisms levied against multiples, but in the main these can be summarised as:
 Simplistic: A multiple is a distillation of a great deal of information into a single number or series of numbers. By combining many value drivers into a point estimate, multiples may make it difficult to disaggregate the effect of different drivers, such as growth, on value. The danger is that this encourages simplistic – and possibly erroneous – interpretation.
 Static: A multiple represents a snapshot of where a firm is at a point in time, but fails to capture the dynamic and ever-evolving nature of business and competition.
 Difficulties in comparisons: Multiples are primarily used to make comparisons of relative value. But comparing multiples is an exacting art form, because there are so many reasons that multiples can differ, not all of which relate to true differences in value. For example, different accounting policies can result in diverging multiples for otherwise identical operating businesses.
 Dependence on correctly valued peers: The use of multiples only reveals patterns in relative values, not absolute values such as those obtained from discounted cash flow valuations. If the peer group as a whole is incorrectly valued (such as may happen during a stock market "bubble") then the resulting multiples will also be misvalued.
 Short-term: Multiples are based on historic data or near-term forecasts. Valuations based on multiples will therefore fail to capture differences in projected performance over the longer term, and will have difficulty correctly valuing cyclical industries unless somewhat subjective normalization adjustments are made.

Advantages
Despite these disadvantages, multiples have several advantages.
 Usefulness: Valuation is about judgment, and multiples provide a framework for making value judgements. When used properly, multiples are robust tools that can provide useful information about relative value.
 Simplicity: Their very simplicity and ease of calculation makes multiples an appealing and user-friendly method of assessing value. Multiples can help the user avoid the potentially misleading precision of other, more 'precise' approaches such as discounted cash flow valuation or EVA, which can create a false sense of comfort.
 Relevance: Multiples focus on the key statistics that other investors use. Since investors in aggregate move markets, the most commonly used statistics and multiples will have the most impact.

These factors, and the existence of wide-ranging comparables, help explain the enduring use of multiples by investors despite the rise of other methods.

Comparison of commonly used valuation multiples

Equity price based multiples
Equity price based multiples are most relevant where investors acquire minority positions in companies. Care should be used when comparing companies with very different capital structures. Different debt levels will affect equity multiples because of the gearing effect of debt. In addition, equity multiples will not explicitly take into account balance sheet risk.

Enterprise value based multiples
Enterprise value based multiples are particularly relevant in mergers & acquisitions where the whole of the company’s stock and liabilities are acquired. Certain multiples such as EV/EBITDA are also a useful complements to valuations of minority interests, especially when the P/E ratio is difficult to interpret because of significant differences in capital structures, in accounting policies or in cases where net earnings are negative or low.

Example (discounted forward PE ratio method)

Mathematics 

Condition: Peer company is profitable.

Rf = discount rate during the last forecast year

tf = last year of the forecast period.

C = correction factor

P = current stock Price

NPP = net profit peer company

NPO = net profit of target company after forecast period

S = number of shares

Process data diagram 
The following diagram shows an overview of the process of company valuation using multiples. All activities in this model are explained in more detail in section 3: Using the multiples method.

Using the multiples method

Determine forecast period 
Determine the year after which the company value is to be known.

Example:

'VirusControl' is an ICT startup that has just finished their business plan. Their goal is to provide professionals with software for simulating virus outbreaks. Their only investor is required to wait for 5 years before making an exit. Therefore, VirusControl is using a forecast period of 5 years.

Identifying peer company 
Search the (stock)market for companies most comparable to the target company. From the investor perspective, a peer universe can also contain companies that are not only direct product competitors but are subject to similar cycles, suppliers and other external factors (e.g. a door and a window manufacturer may be considered peers as well).

Important characteristics include: operating margin, company size, products, customer segmentation, growth rate, cash flow, number of employees, etc.

Example:

VirusControl has identified 4 other companies similar to itself.
 Medical Sim
 Global Plan
 Virus Solutions
 PM Software

Determining correct price earning ratio (P/E) 
The price earnings ratio (P/E) of each identified peer company can be calculated as long as they are profitable.  The P/E is calculated as:

P/E = Current stock price / (Net profit / Weighted average number of shares)

Particular attention is paid to companies with P/E ratios substantially higher or lower than the peer group. A P/E far below the average can mean (among other reasons) that the true value of a company has not been identified by the market, that the business model is flawed, or that the most recent profits include, for example, substantial one-off items. Companies with P/E ratios substantially different from the peers (the outliers) can be removed or other corrective measures used to avoid this problem.

Example:

P/E ratio of companies similar to VirusControl:

One company, PM Software, has substantially lower P/E ratio than the others. Further market research shows that PM Software has recently acquired a government contract to supply the military with simulating software for the next three years. Therefore, VirusControl decides to discard this P/E ratio and only use the values of 17.95, 21.7 and 20.8.

Determining future company value 
The value of the target company after the forecast period can be calculated by:

Average corrected P/E ratio * net profit at the end of the forecast period.

Example:

VirusControl is expecting a net profit at the end of the fifth year of about €2.2 million. They use the following calculation to determine their future value:

((17.95 + 21.7 + 20.8) / 3) * 2,200,000 = €44.3 million

Determining discount rate / factor 
Determine the appropriate discount rate and factor for the last year of the forecast period based on the risk level associated with the target company

Example:

VirusControl has chosen their discount rate very high as their company is potentially very profitable but also very risky. They calculate their discount factor based on five years.

Determining current company value 
Calculate the current value of the future company value by multiplying the future business value with the discount factor. This is known as the time value of money.

Example:

VirusControl multiplies their future company value with the discount factor:

44,300,000 * 0.1316 = 5,829,880 The company or equity value of VirusControl: €5.83 million

See also
 market-based valuation
 relative valuation

References

External links
 Comparable Companies Analysis
 Valuation Multiples: A Primer UBS Warburg.
 Valuation Multiples by Industry
 Valuation Multiples - Key Drivers

Corporate finance
Mergers and acquisitions
Valuation (finance)